Double Dutch may refer to:

 Double Dutch (album), by the Eames Era, 2005
 "Double Dutch" (song), by Malcolm McLaren, 1983
 Double Dutch (jump rope), a skipping game 
 Double Dutch (novel), by Sharon Draper, 2002
 Double Dutch (writing style), used by John O'Mill
 Double Dutch, a variety of Girl Scouts Cookies

See also
 Gibberish, speech that is or appears to be nonsense
 -izzle, a slang suffix to form hip-hop-sounding words
 Language game
 Ubbi dubbi
 "Double Dutch Bus", a 1980 song by Frankie Smith